State Bank of Pakistan cricket team was a first-class cricket team sponsored by the State Bank of Pakistan. They competed in Pakistan's first-class List A and Twenty20 tournaments.

1980s
State Bank of Pakistan made their first-class debut (along with  Pakistan Automobiles Corporation) in the Quaid-i-Azam Trophy in 1983-84, but lost all their nine matches. In a bizarre match against Muslim Commercial Bank they were dismissed for 73 and 57. Wisden explained: "Owing to injuries State Bank batted six short in each innings." Apart from that match, their last one of the season, they were dismissed for between 114 and 255 in every innings. In the first match Tariq Javed scored 124 in the second innings. It was the team's only century in the 1980s.

They next played in the BCCP President's Cup in 1986-87, losing all three of their matches with totals of 186, 54, 79, 229, 111 and 106.

2010 onwards
State Bank of Pakistan returned to first-class status in 2010-11 with a stronger team, finishing second in Division Two of the Quaid-i-Azam Trophy with 4 wins, 1 loss and 4 draws from 9 matches. They were promoted to Division One for the 2011-12 season, where they finished fourth, with 5 wins, 3 losses and 3 draws. In the President's Trophy in 2012-13 they finished ninth out of eleven teams, with 2 wins, 4 losses and 3 draws, and in 2013-14 they finished tenth, with 2 wins, 5 losses and 3 draws.

Notable players
 Nayyer Abbas
 Maqbool Ahmed
 Mukhtar Ahmed
 Mohammad Ali
 Mohtashim Ali
 Faisal Athar
 Farhan Khan
 Jalat Khan
 Hasan Mahmood

References

External links
 Lists of matches played by State Bank of Pakistan

Pakistani first-class cricket teams